The Kosovo women's national handball team represents Kosovo in international women's handball and is controlled by the Handball Federation of Kosovo. The national handball team started competing in international competition in 2015, following Kosovo's full status recognition from the International Handball Federation (IHF).

History
Handball first arrived in Kosovo in the late 1940s, and by 1948 there were several registered clubs starting to compete in informal domestic competitions. By 1951, indoor handball was introduced. Two years later, in 1953 Kosovo Handball Federation was founded, under the auspices of the Yugoslav Handball Federation.

In 1979, whilst part of the former Yugoslavia, Kosovo hosted the 1979 Women's Junior World Handball Championship.

Following the breakdown of Yugoslavia and subsequent independence of Kosovo as a nation, Kosovo Handball Federation began operating independently. 

In 2014, six years after Kosovo declared independence, the European Handball Federation (EHF) recognised Kosovo as a full member state and immediately the Kosovo national handball team started competing in international competition.

Team

Current squad
The following players were selected to participate at the 2022 European Women's Handball Championship qualification matches, between 3 and 5 June, 2021.

Matches and goals as of 27 April 2022.

Head coach: Agron Shabani

Coaches
 Florent Beqiri (2014–2018)
 Agron Shabani (2018 - )

Captains
Leonora Demaj (2017 - )

Individual all-time records

Most matches played
Total number of matches played in official competitions only.

Last updated: 27 April 2022 Source:

Most goals scored
Total number of goals scored in official competitions only.

Last updated: 27 April 2022 Source:

Kit suppliers
Since 2019, Kosovo's kits have been supplied by Kempa.

References

External links
Official website
IHF profile

Handball
Women's national handball teams